Craig Taro Gold (born November 1969), known as Taro Gold, is an American author, entertainer, singer-songwriter, and entrepreneur. He is the author of several New York Times best-selling books including Open Your Mind, Open Your Life and Living Wabi Sabi. He is the co-author with Tina Turner of the Atria Books release Happiness Becomes You: A Guide to Changing Your Life for Good. He is also the co-founder of a number of technology companies including eVoice, Teleo and other business ventures.

Education
Gold attended a Montessori education preparatory academy from the age of 2, and Torrey Pines High School in his hometown of Del Mar, California. At age 15, he spent an academic year as an AFS Intercultural Programs scholar in Canberra and Brisbane, Australia. He earned a Bachelor of Science degree from Soka University in Tokyo, Japan, where he studied economics, psychology, and philosophy, graduating summa cum laude in 1994. Gold earned the distinction of becoming the first American man to graduate from Soka University.  His postgraduate education included international relations and Spanish at the University of Salamanca in Spain,  then screenwriting and computer graphics and graphic design at UCLA.

Entertainment career
Gold's career in entertainment began at an early age when he appeared in Broadway musicals as a child. He performed in the first national tour of the Broadway musical Evita, directed by Hal Prince, between 1980 and 1982. At age 12, after more than 700 performances with the show, Gold left the cast.

In 1982, Gold was cast as the lead role of Jason by director James Lapine in the Los Angeles production of the Broadway musical March of the Falsettos. Gold played the son of Marvin and Trina (played by Michael Rupert and Melanie Chertoff). In 1983, Gold won a spot in the original teen troupe of The Groundlings, where he studied and performed improv at Groundlings Theatre in Los Angeles. In 1984, he was cast as the starring character of John in the world premiere of the musical Peter Pan at the Pantages Theatre in Hollywood.

From the mid-1980s to mid-1990s, Gold also worked as voice-over artist for the Disney Channel, as a print model for PUMA sportswear and Versace men's underwear, as an actor in Duncan Hines commercials, and appeared on an NBC television special with Clint Eastwood.

In Japan, Gold produced a 14-track solo album titled The Diamond You, which was released in Asia by Virgin Music Japan in 2008. Several tracks from the album appear in Sony PlayStation video games, including Vibes.

In 2020, Tina Turner selected the title song from Gold's album, titled The Diamond You, for the soundtrack to Turner's memoir Happiness Becomes You. The soundtrack was published by Graydon Carter's Air Mail digital magazine and on Spotify.

Gold executive produced Out in the Line-Up, an independent documentary film following two friends on a global journey to discover the emerging LGBT acceptance in international surf culture. The film premiered on February 20, 2014, at the Sydney Mardi Gras Film Festival in Australia, where it won the "Best Documentary" audience award. It went on to win "Best Film" at festivals including the 2014 Newport Beach Film Festival and the 2014 San Diego Surf Film Festival, and "Best Documentary" at the 2014 London Film Festival. 

In 2021, Gold served as a consultant on the HBO documentary film Tina, about the life of Tina Turner, and in 2022 he produced the short film Masaru, about the challenges of a gay Japanese-American boy growing up between the culture clash of Japanese and American societal expectations. Masaru was awarded the Best Short Fiction Film award at the 2022 Málaga Film Festival in Spain.

Writing career
Gold is a New York Times best-selling author of numerous books published by Andrews McMeel Publishing. His books have sold more than two million copies and have been published in eleven languages worldwide. His first book, Open Your Mind, Open Your Life, was released in 2001 and became a perennial best seller that was published in English, French, Portuguese, Spanish, Hebrew, Japanese, and Korean. The book received a strong endorsement from Arun Gandhi, director of the Gandhi Institute and grandson of Mahatma Gandhi, who said of Open Your Mind, Open Your Life: "This book will enlighten and ennoble the reader." The book's cover was created by Gold and designer Laura Shaw, and its depiction of purple irises became an iconic image of Gold's literary work that later influenced the development of a Taro Gold brand logo.

Gold's book Living Wabi Sabi: The True Beauty of Your Life received a Benjamin Franklin Literary Award and was a recommended read by Time magazine, featured in a Time holiday gift guide, and subsequently featured in a Time article on Asian aesthetic philosophies. In 2018, Tina Turner told The New York Times that Gold's Living Wabi Sabi was one of her all-time favorite books of inspiration.

In 2011, British journalist Marcel Theroux presented "In Search of Wabi Sabi" on BBC Four as part of the channel's Hidden Japan programming, beginning by enacting a challenge from Gold's book Living Wabi Sabi to "ask people on a Tokyo street to describe Wabi Sabi." Theroux showed that, as Gold predicted, "they will likely give you a polite shrug and explain that Wabi Sabi is simply unexplainable."

Gold's What is Love? A Simple Guide to Romantic Happiness received a Book of the Year Award from ForeWord Reviews. What is Love? and Gold's other works have been cited by various authors including in the books Even June Cleaver Would Forget The Juice Box and Wisdom For The Soul. All of Gold's books have received endorsements and positive reviews from Publishers Weekly.

Gold has written essays for magazines and newspapers including The Advocate, the World Tribune, Tricycle: The Buddhist Review, Parabola, and Beliefnet. He also served as an associate editor for three years with Living Buddhism, a publication where he was a regular contributor.

Select bibliography
 Happiness Becomes You (with co-author Tina Turner), Atria Books (2020)
 心を開けば,人生も開く (Open Your Mind, Open Your Life) Japanese language (2012)
 侘び寂びを生きる (Living Wabi Sabi) Japanese language (2010)
 לפתוח את הראש, חיים פתוחים (Open Your Mind, Open Your Life) Hebrew language, Focus Publishing (2009)
 愛とは？ (What Is Love?) Japanese language (2008)
 Ouvrez Votre Esprit à la Vie (Open Your Mind, Open Your Life) French language, ADA Éditions (2008)
 Qué es el Amor? (What Is Love?) Spanish language, Grupo Editorial Panorama (2007)
 The Tao of Dad: The Wisdom of Fathers Near and Far, Andrews McMeel Publishing (2006)
 The Tao of Mom: The Wisdom of Mothers from East to West, Andrews McMeel Publishing (2005)
 Living Wabi Sabi: The True Beauty of Your Life, Andrews McMeel Publishing (2004)
 Abra Sua Mente, Abra Sua Vida (Open Your Mind, Open Your Life) Portuguese language, Editora Sextante (2004)
 Open Your Mind, Open Your Life (Box Kit), Andrews McMeel Publishing (2004)
 What Is Love? A Simple Guide to Romantic Happiness, Andrews McMeel Publishing (2003)
 오픈 유어 마인드, 오픈 유어 라이프 (Open Your Mind, Open Your Life) Korean language, Jisangsa (2002)
 Open Your Mind, Open Your Life (Second Volume), Andrews McMeel Publishing (2002)
 Open Your Mind, Open Your Life: A Little Book Of Eastern Wisdom, Andrews McMeel Publishing (2001)

Technology career
Gold has been involved in many business ventures beyond entertainment and writing. His entrepreneurial career began in 2000 when he co-founded the telecommunications company eVoice, which provided the world's first large-scale, Internet-enabled voicemail system with products including voicemail-to-email, visual voicemail and enhanced caller ID innovations. These Voice over IP innovations were the foundation for future apps deployed by Google Voice and Apple. During this time, Gold helped innovate a voice recognition technology known as Vodex. eVoice was acquired by AOL in 2001 and became part of the AOL voice services group. The company was then purchased by j2 Global.

After AOL's acquisition of eVoice, Gold became the founding CEO of Call Forwarding Services (CFS), an internet startup that provided white label VoIP communications services to AT&T, MCI Inc. and Qwest. CFS was acquired by Qwest in 2002.

In 2005, Gold helped launch another communications startup called Teleo. The company provided a VoIP system enabling desktop and laptop users to send and receive phone calls over the Internet. Teleo was acquired by Microsoft in 2006 and became part of Microsoft's MSN group.

As a Silicon Valley angel investor, Gold has helped raise funds for several successful startup companies including CallCast (acquired by LiveOps in 2003), and IronPort (acquired by Cisco in 2007 for US$830 million).

In 2008, Gold ventured into the health and fitness app development market as the founding CEO of WebDiet. The patented  technology of WebDiet uses mobile phones to count food consumption and was the first app to count calories and automate meal coaching. Weight loss company Nutrisystem used WebDiet's technology.

In 2014, Gold helped launch Vusay, a social media platform that made YouTube and other online videos more interactive and viral, allowing users to add comments that highlight specific moments in videos, then seamlessly share them on Twitter and Facebook.

In 2016, Gold became an advisory board member of Averon, which develops cybersecurity solutions and artificial intelligent applications.

Philanthropy
Gold's philanthropic activities have included private sponsorship of underprivileged students in Asia and South America. He is also a long-time supporter of the Trevor Project, founded in 1998 by his friend Celeste Lecesne. Profits from a Taro Gold CafePress "Diamond You" shop benefited The Trever Project from 2002 to 2017.  In 2005, Gold endowed a named scholarship at Soka University of America called "The Rainbow Family Fund" for LGBT students and families.

Gold has been a Patron Circle member of the Sundance Institute and Sundance Film Festival since 2006, and of Sundance London since 2013.

Personal life
Gold is married to American computer scientist and entrepreneur Wendell Brown. Gold states that he has maintained a vegan diet since the age of 5 when his mother adopted veganism, that he practices yoga, and is an animal rights supporter. During his childhood, high school, and university years, he lived on four continents including Del Mar, California, in North America; Tokyo, Japan, in Asia; Canberra and Brisbane in Australia; and Salamanca, Spain, in Europe.

A 2014 Vogue Japan story on celebrity life in Tokyo noted that Gold lived in the luxury Park Hyatt Tokyo Hotel atop the Shinjuku Park Tower from 2006 to 2008.

References

External links

1969 births
Living people
21st-century American male writers
American Buddhists
American gay writers
American male film actors
American male musical theatre actors
American male non-fiction writers
American male stage actors
American spiritualists
American spiritual writers
American writers of Japanese descent
IronPort people
Jewish American male actors
Jewish American philanthropists
Jewish American writers
LGBT Buddhists
American LGBT businesspeople
American LGBT rights activists
Members of Sōka Gakkai
New Age spiritual leaders
New Age writers
New Thought writers
Nichiren Buddhists
Sōka University alumni